John Frederick "Jiggs" Donahue (April 19, 1894 – October 3, 1949) was a right fielder in Major League Baseball who played briefly for the Boston Red Sox during the 1923 season. He was born in Roxbury, Massachusetts.
 
In a 10-game career, Donahue was a .278 hitter (10-for-36) with four doubles, five runs, and one RBI. He did not hit a home run. As a fielder, he collected 21 outs with four assists and did not commit an error in 25 chances for a perfect 1.000 fielding percentage.  
 
Donahue died in Boston, Massachusetts, at age 55.

See also
Boston Red Sox all-time roster

Sources
Baseball Reference
Retrosheet

Boston Red Sox players
Major League Baseball right fielders
Baseball players from Massachusetts
1894 births
1949 deaths
New Bedford Whalers (baseball) players